Francis Gordon Turner (1 March 1890 – 21 November 1979) was an English first-class cricketer. Turner was a right-handed batsman and a leg break bowler.

Turner represented Hampshire in one first-class match in 1914 against Cambridge University.

Turner died in Deal, Kent on 21 November 1979.

External links
Francis Turner at Cricinfo
Francis Turner at CricketArchive

1890 births
1979 deaths
Sportspeople from Kensington
Cricketers from Greater London
English cricketers
Hampshire cricketers